Dyschirius similatus is a species of ground beetle in the subfamily Scaritinae. It was described by Betta in 1847.

References

similatus
Beetles described in 1847